The Church of St. Joseph is a historic Roman Catholic church building in St. Joseph, Minnesota, United States.  It is part of the Roman Catholic Diocese of Saint Cloud.  It was constructed in a German immigrant community in 1869, though the tower wasn't completed until 1884.  A rectory stands east of the church.  Both buildings were listed on the National Register of Historic Places in 1982 for their state-level significance in the themes of architecture, exploration/settlement, and religion.  The property was nominated for reflecting the settlement of rural Stearns County by Catholic immigrant groups clustered in small, ethnic hamlets dominated by a central church.

History
The first Mass in the community was celebrated by Francis Xavier Pierz on October 22, 1854, when the town was still named Clinton. The first church building was completed a year later, and a small log school building was attached in 1860. Construction began in 1869, and on June 29, 1871, Bishop Thomas Grace consecrated the building. This was the first consecrated church in Minnesota made of permanent materials. The rectory was built in 1874 using similar fieldstone construction. Ten years later the church tower was completed. Four years after that, in 1888, the church and rectory were connected by a stylistically consistent passageway.

See also
 List of Catholic churches in the United States
 National Register of Historic Places listings in Stearns County, Minnesota

References

External links
 
 Church of Saint Joseph

1869 establishments in Minnesota
Churches in Stearns County, Minnesota
Churches in the Roman Catholic Diocese of Saint Cloud
German-American culture in Minnesota
Gothic Revival church buildings in Minnesota
National Register of Historic Places in Stearns County, Minnesota
Roman Catholic churches completed in 1869
Churches on the National Register of Historic Places in Minnesota
19th-century Roman Catholic church buildings in the United States